Allar Cave is an archaeological site and Middle Paleolithic human settlement.

The cave was discovered in 1993 during an archeological expedition organized by the Institute of Archeology and Ethnography of the Azerbaijan National Academy of Sciences, under the guidance of A.G. Jafarov. The expedition uncovered nine Middle Paleolithic stone items.

References

External links
 Zar mağara düşərgəsi Website of the Ministry of Culture and Tourism of Azerbaijan.

Caves of Azerbaijan
Paleoanthropological sites
Prehistoric sites in Azerbaijan
Archaeological sites in Azerbaijan
History of Talysh